Arsène Copa (born 7 June 1988 in Moanda) is a Gabonese footballer, who currently plays for Pélican.

International career
The midfielder is a member of the Gabon national football team.

References

 Player profile at HLSZ 

1988 births
Living people
People from Moanda
Gabonese footballers
Association football midfielders
Gabon international footballers
2010 Africa Cup of Nations players
AS Mangasport players
Győri ETO FC players
FC DAC 1904 Dunajská Streda players
AS Pélican players
Gabon Championnat National D1 players
Nemzeti Bajnokság I players
Slovak Super Liga players
Gabonese expatriate footballers
Expatriate footballers in Hungary
Expatriate footballers in Slovakia
Gabonese expatriate sportspeople in Hungary
Gabonese expatriate sportspeople in Slovakia
21st-century Gabonese people